Alkaliflexus is a genus in the phylum Bacteroidota (Bacteria).

Etymology
The name Alkaliflexus derives from:New Latin noun alkali (from Arabic al-qalyi, the ashes of saltwort), soda ash; Latin participle adjective flexus, bent; New Latin masculine gender noun Alkaliflexus, referring to life in basic surroundings and to bending/flexible cells.

Species
The genus contains a single species, namely A. imshenetskii ( Zhilina et al. 2005,  (Type species of the genus).; New Latin genitive case masculine gender noun imshenetskii, of Imshenetskii, named after Aleksandr A. Imshenetskii (1905–1992), a microbiologist who devoted much of his research to the microbial degradation of cellulose, and gliding bacteria.)

See also
 Bacterial taxonomy
 Microbiology

References 

Bacteria genera
Bacteroidia
Monotypic bacteria genera